Oadby and Wigston Borough Council elections are held every four years. Oadby and Wigston Borough Council is the local authority for the non-metropolitan district of Oadby and Wigston in Leicestershire, England. Since the last boundary changes in 2003, 26 councillors have been elected from 10 wards.

Political control
The first election to the council was held in 1973, initially operating as a shadow authority before coming into its powers on 1 April 1974. Since 1973 political control of the council has been held by the following parties:

Leadership
The leaders of the council since 2014 have been:

Council elections
1973 Oadby and Wigston Borough Council election
1976 Oadby and Wigston Borough Council election
1979 Oadby and Wigston Borough Council election (New ward boundaries)
1980 Oadby and Wigston Borough Council election
1982 Oadby and Wigston Borough Council election
1983 Oadby and Wigston Borough Council election
1984 Oadby and Wigston Borough Council election
1986 Oadby and Wigston Borough Council election
1987 Oadby and Wigston Borough Council election
1988 Oadby and Wigston Borough Council election (Borough boundary changes took place but the number of seats remained the same)
1990 Oadby and Wigston Borough Council election
1991 Oadby and Wigston Borough Council election
1995 Oadby and Wigston Borough Council election
1999 Oadby and Wigston Borough Council election
2003 Oadby and Wigston Borough Council election (New ward boundaries)
2007 Oadby and Wigston Borough Council election
2011 Oadby and Wigston Borough Council election
2015 Oadby and Wigston Borough Council election
2019 Oadby and Wigston Borough Council election

Election results

By-election results

2003-2007

2007-2011

2015-2019

2019-2023

References

By-election results

External links
Oadby and Wigston Borough Council

 
Oadby and Wigston
Council elections in Leicestershire
District council elections in England